Ruhugu virus, scientific name Rubivirus ruteetense, is a species of virus in the genus Rubivirus. It was discovered in 2019 in healthy Ugandan bats. It belongs to the family of Matonaviridae, a single-stranded RNA of positive polarity which is enclosed by an icosahedral capsid.

Discovery and habitat
Ruhugu virus was discovered in healthy Cyclops roundleaf bats in Kibale National Park, Uganda. prior to the COVID-19 pandemic, while looking for coronaviruses carried by bats.

Etymology
Ruhugu virus was named after the Ruteete region of Uganda and the word in the local Tooro language, which describes "the flapping of bat wings in the hollow of a tree: obuhuguhugu"

Structure
Ruhugu virus is closely related to Rubella virus and differs in only one amino acid in the protein it uses to get into host cells. In the fusion protein of the virus and two putative T cell epitopes in the capsid protein of the ruhugu virus the amino acid sequences of four putative B cell epitopes are moderately to highly conserved, suggesting ruhugu viruses have a similar capacity for fusion with the host-cell membrane like rubella virus.

References 

Rubella
Viruses